Hubert Koundé (born December 30, 1970) is a French actor and film director. Koundé is best known for his role as Hubert in the film La Haine by Mathieu Kassovitz.

Background
Koundé spent his childhood between Benin and France, where he was born.

Career
In addition to  La Haine, Koundé is also the author of a play: "Cagoule: Valentine and Yamina," performed in 2003 (Cagoule: Valentin et Yamina, montée en 2003). He has made two short films: Qui se ressemble s'assemble and Menhir, and co-directed a feature film:  Paris, la métisse. He has also worked in English-language films such as The Constant Gardener.

Filmography

Actor
 1992: Le Temps d'une nuit
 1992: Diên Biên Phu by Pierre Schoendoerffer
 1993: Métisse by Mathieu Kassovitz: Jamal Saddam Abossolo M'bo
 1995: La Haine by Mathieu Kassovitz: Hubert — nominated for the César Award for Most Promising Actor
 1996: Colis postal
 1996: La Sicilia by Luc Pien: Désiré Mbuyu
 1997: Saraka bô by Denis Amar: Blanche-Neige
 1997: La Divine Poursuite by Michel Deville: Mamadou
 1998: Restons groupés by Jean-Paul Salomé: Aimé
 1999: Simon le mage by Ildiko Enyedi
 2000: Qui se ressemble s'assemble: le lecteur
 2000: Tout va bien, on s'en va by Claude Mouriéras: Arthur
 2001: Comment j'ai tué mon père d'Anne Fontaine: Jean-Toussaint
 2001: Ndeysaan (Le prix du pardon) by Mansour Sora Wade: Yatma
 2004: The Constant Gardener by Fernando Meirelles: Arnold Bluhm
 2011: Mister Bob by Thomas Vincent.
 2017: Gangsterdam by Romain Lévy: Ulysse Abraham Bakel

Director
 1998: Menhir (short film)
 2000: Qui se ressemble s'assemble (short film)
 2005: Paris, la métisse

Writer
 1998: Menhir (short film)
 2000: Qui se ressemble s'assemble (short film)

Television 
 1992 : Nestor Burma, 1 episode
 1995 : Les Cinq Dernières Minutes, episode Meurtre à l'université : Francis
 1997 : Les Enfants du Karoo
 1998 : Maternité
 2005 : Quelques jours en avril : Père Salomon
 2005 : L'Arbre et l'oiseau : inspector Kwame
 2006 : Plus belle la vie : Étienne Anglade (seasons 2 and 3)
 2007 : Greco, episode Contact : Thierry Benesh
 2008 : La Cour des grands, episode Alison : Virgil Bouaké
 2008 : Central Nuit, episode Celui qui n'existe pas : Omar Touré
 2008 : Le Voyage de la veuve : Léopold
 2009 : Pigalle, la nuit : Adam
 2010 : 1788... et demi by Olivier Guignard : Balthazar Beugnot
 2011 : Braquo (saison 2) by Éric Valette and Philippe Haïm — Jonas Luanda
 2011 : La Couleur de l'océan by Maggie Peren : Zola
 2012 : Toussaint Louverture by Philippe Niang : Jean-Jacques Dessalines
 2014 : La Vallée des Mensonges : Police lieutenant

Theater 
 2001 : Le Costume by Mothobe Mutloatse, directed by Peter Brook
 2004 : Cagoule by and directed by Hubert Koundé

Awards
 1996:  César Award for Most Promising Actor for La Haine

References

External links

1970 births
Living people
French male film actors
French male screenwriters
French screenwriters
French people of Beninese descent
People from Seine-Saint-Denis
French male television actors